Insound Tour Support No. 12 is a 2000 split EP by Bright Eyes and Son, Ambulance, released through Saddle Creek Records. 

The version of "I Won't Ever Be Happy Again" is an older recording than the one found on "Don't Be Frightened of Turning the Page".

Track listing 
 "I Won't Ever Be Happy Again" - Bright Eyes
 "The Joy in Discovery" - Bright Eyes
 "The Joy in Forgetting/The Joy in Acceptance" - Bright Eyes
 "Like Billy Budd or Cyrano de Begerac" - Son, Ambulance
 "The Woman in the Underpass" - Son, Ambulance
 "Astrud, Astrud" - Son, Ambulance
 "Lovers Turn Into Monsters" - Bright Eyes

Split EPs
Bright Eyes (band) EPs
2000 EPs